A number of vessels of the People's Liberation Army Navy have borne the name Nanjing, after the capital Nanjing.

 , in service 1977–2012. Now a Museum ship in Shanghai.
 , a Type 052D destroyer, in service since 2018.

References 

People's Liberation Army Navy ship names